Sofia W. D. (12 October 1924 – 23 July 1986) was an Indonesian actress and film director. She appeared in 43 films between 1952 and 1986. Her film Badai-Selatan was entered into the 12th Berlin International Film Festival.

Selected filmography
 Badai-Selatan (1962)
 Max Havelaar (1975)
 Mystics in Bali (1981)
 Pengkhianatan G30S/PKI (1984)

References

External links

1924 births
1986 deaths
20th-century Indonesian actresses
Actresses from West Java
Indonesian film actresses
Indonesian film directors
Indonesian women film directors
People from Bandung
Sundanese people